Kajal Jain (born 10 September 1985) is an Indian model and actress. She participated in the Femina Miss India contest in 2008 and was in the top 10 finalist. Kajal represented India at the Top Model of the World contest'09. She made her screen debut in the Punjabi movie Yaar Annmulle (2011) with Arya Babbar and Yuvraj Hans.

Career
In 2011 Kajal played the lead role in the Punjabi movie Yaar Anmulle (2011) with Arya Babbar and Yuvraj Singh. She then featured in Mere Yaar Kaminey (2013) starring Inderjit Niikku and Karan Kundra and Himmat Singh (2014) with Arjan Bajwa. Along with films Kajal has also appeared in Indian television shows including Buddha, and Sinhasan Battisi. She co-featured with many Bollywood actors in commercials for Samsung, Blue Star, Nokia, Tanishq, Santoor, Hyundai and Cinthol.

Filmography

Television

References

External links
Sinhasan Battisi actress Kajal Jain to study scriptwriting in Los Angeles

Female models from Madhya Pradesh
Indian television actresses
Living people
1985 births